John Albert "Kayo" Dottley (August 25, 1928 – November 17, 2018) was an American football fullback in the National Football League who played for the Chicago Bears.

Biography 
Dottley played high school football in McGehee, Arkansas. At Ole Miss, Dottley was the first running back in the school's history to record back-to-back 1,000-yard seasons in 1949-1950.  He also holds the single season rushing record of 1312 yards in 1949.

In his autobiography, Hall of Famer Art Donovan paid Dottley this tribute: "They talk about Walter Payton making people pay for bringing him down, but Payton's nothing but a Fancy Dan compared to a halfback who used to play for the Bears named John Dottley, a tough big kid from Mississippi."

Honors
 First-team All-America selection (1949)
 Pro Bowl selection (1951)
 Mississippi Sports Hall of Fame (1971)
 Ole Miss Sports Hall of Fame (1987)
Ole Miss Team of the Century (1893–1992)

See also
 List of college football yearly rushing leaders

References

1928 births
2018 deaths
Players of American football from Birmingham, Alabama
People from McGehee, Arkansas
Players of American football from Arkansas
American football fullbacks
Ole Miss Rebels football players
Chicago Bears players
Western Conference Pro Bowl players